Dechheling Gewog (Dzongkha: བདེ་ཆེན་གླིང་) is a gewog (village block) of Pemagatshel District, Bhutan. Dechenling Gewog is part of Nganglam Dungkhag, along with Nganglam and Norbugang Gewogs.

References

External links 
 https://web.archive.org/web/20100503060847/http://www.pemagatshel.gov.bt/gewogDetail.php?id=35

Gewogs of Bhutan
Pemagatshel District